Jules Seveste, full name Désiré Henri Jules Seveste, (Paris, 1803 – Meudon, 30 June 1854 ) was a French playwright and theatre manager of the first half of the 19th century.

Short biography 
In 1822 his father Pierre Seveste (1773–1825) appointed Jules and his brother Edmond to his theatre agency (founded c. 1810) which in 1817 had been granted a privilege to open suburban theaters. Pierre had opened the Théâtre Montparnasse in 1819, and he and his sons opened the Théâtre de Montmartre in 1822. After Pierre's death, his widow and sons opened the Théâtre de Belleville in 1827 and the Théâtre Grenelle in 1830. In 1848, Jules asked for the reopening of the Belleville and Montmartre theatres.

On 1 September 1852, Jules succeeded his brother Edmond as managing director of the Opéra-National, after Adolphe Adam refused the position. On 12 April 1853, he renamed it Théâtre Lyrique. Jules Verne, co-librettist with Michel Carré of the one-act opéra-comique Le Colin-Maillard, which Seveste produced on 28 April 1853, became the secretary with a salary of 1,200 francs a year, an office Verne would leave in 1855.

Jules Seveste died of a massive stroke Friday, 30 June 1854, at ten o'clock at night and not from cholera as often indicated.

Works 
1825: Christophe et Lubin, comédie vaudeville in 1 act, with Edmond Seveste
1827: La Lanterne, vaudeville, avec Edmond Seveste
1832: La Sylphide, drama in 2 acts, with Ernest Jaime
1833: L'Élève de la nature, ou Jeanne et Jenny, play in 5 acts and 2 parts, with E. Jaime
1836: Amaglia ou la Fille du diable, drame fantastique in 5 acts, with Émile Vanderbuck
1852: Les fiançailles des roses, opéra comique, with Charles Deslys

Notes

Bibliography 
 Discours prononcés sur la tombe de M. Jules Seveste, 1854
 Philippe Chauveau, Les théâtres parisiens disparus: 1402-1986, 1999, (p. 322)
 Jules Verne et la musique,  n°24, 2007, (p. 97)
 McCormick, John (1995). "Seveste, Pierre-Jacques", pp. 977–978, in The Cambridge Guide to the Theatre, edited by Martin Banham. Cambridge: Cambridge University Press. .

19th-century French dramatists and playwrights
French theatre managers and producers
Writers from Paris
1803 births
1854 deaths